Day & Date was an American daily syndicated newsmagazine program that aired for two seasons from September 11, 1995 to January 3, 1997. Syndicated by Group W Productions (later renamed Eyemark Entertainment following the 1996 merger of Group W and CBS), it was hosted by Dana King and Patrick Vanhorn. The program was intended as a lead-in to local early news programs.

Background
The series debuted on September 11, 1995, for the start of the 1995 television season. It was picked up by a variety of stations, some of which had just switched to CBS following deals that had taken effect earlier in 1995 (or, in some cases, the day before) resulting from the 1994–1996 United States broadcast television realignment. Segments combined news, talk, and entertainment issues. Toward the end of its run, Gordon Elliott joined as an occasional correspondent.

Its second season premiered on September 9, 1996, on 87 stations serving 74 percent of the country. Despite low ratings, it was the only freshman first-run strip syndicated program renewed for the 1996–1997 television stations. A new format was instituted, focusing on features and less on news headlines. but low ratings (a 1.6 for the second season) spurred Eyemark to cancel Day & Date effective January 3, 1997. Mid-afternoon local newscasts which launched in the 4 p.m. hour throughout the mid-1990s had also made the program superfluous with the growth of syndicated and wire service segments featuring the same type of content in the same timeslots Day and Date were in, with much less expense using local staff and more finessing to a local market's tastes than that of a nationally syndicated program.

References

External links 
 

1995 American television series debuts
1997 American television series endings
First-run syndicated television programs in the United States
Television series by CBS Studios